Rokusō-an (六窓庵 "Six Window Hut") is a chashitsu. 

It was initially constructed during the Edo period and later relocated due its deteriorated state and is now in the gardens of the Tokyo National Museum.

See also 
 Sarumen Chaseki at Nagoya Castle
 Hassō-an

References

External links 

Chashitsu
Tokyo National Museum